What Lola Wants is a 2015 American action thriller film written and directed by Rupert Glasson and starring Sophie Lowe.

Cast
Sophie Lowe as Lola
Beau Knapp as Marlo
Dale Dickey as Mama
Robert Taylor as Jed
Charles S. Dutton as Cop
Nathan Sapsford as Store Owner

References

External links
 
 

American action thriller films
2010s English-language films
2010s American films